The Qatar Table Tennis Association is the governing body for the sport of table tennis in Qatar. It is a member of the Arab Table Tennis Association, Asian Table Tennis Association and World Table Tennis. The president of the body is Khalil Almohannad.  

The Federation is currently based at the Al Bidda Tower in Doha.

References

External links 

 Official website
 Instagram Account
 Facebook
 Twitte

ITTF World Tour
Table tennis competitions
Table tennis competitions in Qatar